Vicki Frederick (born January 2, 1949) is an American actress and dancer who has appeared in a number of musicals on Broadway plays, in films, and on popular TV shows such as Mork and Mindy and Happy Days in 1979, and Murder She Wrote in 1990.

Frederick was a protégé of Bob Fosse, dancing in the ensemble and in lead roles in his Broadway productions of Pippin (1972), and Dancin' (1978).

She starred in Robert Aldrich's final film ...All the Marbles (1981), and in the 1984 rock musical film Body Rock, and had a bit part in Fosse's 1979 film All That Jazz. Frederick may be most remembered for her role as the sassy, elegant, long-haired dancer Sheila Bryant in the 1985 movie adaptation A Chorus Line.

Films and TV

Broadway
 Minnie's Boys (1970)
 The Rothschilds (1970–1972)
 Pippin (1972)
 Tricks (1973)
 Cyrano (1973)
 The Pajama Game (1973–1974)
 A Chorus Line (Cassie) (1977)
 Dancin' (1978)
 A Chorus Line (Sheila) (1985)

References

External links
 
 

1954 births
Living people
American film actresses
American television actresses
American musical theatre actresses
Actresses from Georgia (U.S. state)
21st-century American women